Maria Pia Calzone (born 10 October 1967) is an Italian actress, best known for playing the boss's wife, as Immacolata "Imma" Savastano, in the television series, Gomorrah. She graduated from Italy's national film school, the Centro Sperimentale di Cinematografia, and has a degree in literature from the Università degli Studi di Napoli "L'Orientale" in Naples. Calzone has won the Premio Riccardo Cucciolla in 2006 for best lead actress at the Festival di Vasto San Salvo and the Premio Ippocampo for best actress at the Festival di Trieste Maremetraggio 2006.

Selected television
Era mio fratello (2007)
Anita Garibaldi (2012)
Gomorrah (2014, season 1)
Sirene (2017)

Selected filmography
Equilibrium (2002)
Dobbiamo parlare by Sergio Rubini(2015)
Io che amo solo te (2015)
La cena di Natale (2016)Cinderella the Cat (2017)Blessed Madness'' (2018)

References

External links

1967 births
Living people
Italian film actresses
Italian television actresses